Global mass surveillance can be defined as the mass surveillance of entire populations across national borders.

Its existence was not widely acknowledged by governments and the mainstream media until the global surveillance disclosures by Edward Snowden triggered a debate about the right to privacy in the Digital Age.

Its roots can be traced back to the middle of the 20th century when the UKUSA Agreement was jointly enacted by the United Kingdom and the United States, which later expanded to Canada, Australia, and New Zealand to create the present Five Eyes alliance. The alliance developed cooperation arrangements with several "third-party" nations. Eventually, this resulted in the establishment of a global surveillance network, code-named "ECHELON" (1971).

Historical background 

The origins of global surveillance can be traced back to the late 1940s after the UKUSA Agreement was collaboratively enacted by the United Kingdom and the United States, which eventually culminated in the creation of the global surveillance network code-named "ECHELON" in 1971.

In the aftermath of the 1970s Watergate affair and a subsequent congressional inquiry led by Sen. Frank Church, it was revealed that the NSA, in collaboration with Britain's GCHQ, had routinely intercepted the international communications of prominent anti-Vietnam War leaders such as Jane Fonda and Dr. Benjamin Spock. Decades later, a multi-year investigation by the European Parliament highlighted the NSA's role in economic espionage in a report entitled 'Development of Surveillance Technology and Risk of Abuse of Economic Information', in 1999.

However, for the general public, it was a series of detailed disclosures of internal NSA documents in June 2013 that first revealed the massive extent of the NSA's spying, both foreign and domestic. Most of these were leaked by an ex-contractor, Edward Snowden. Even so, a number of these older global surveillance programs such as PRISM, XKeyscore, and Tempora were referenced in the 2013 release of thousands of documents. Many countries around the world, including Western Allies and member states of NATO, have been targeted by the "Five Eyes" strategic alliance of Australia, Canada, New Zealand, the UK, and the United States—five English-speaking Western countries aiming to achieve Total Information Awareness by mastering the Internet with analytical tools such as the Boundless Informant. As confirmed by the NSA's director Keith B. Alexander on 26 September 2013, the NSA collects and stores all phone records of all American citizens. Much of the data is kept in large storage facilities such as the Utah Data Center, a US $1.5 billion megaproject referred to by The Wall Street Journal as a "symbol of the spy agency's surveillance prowess."

On 6 June 2013, Britain's The Guardian newspaper began publishing a series of revelations by an as yet unknown American whistleblower, revealed several days later to be ex-CIA and ex-NSA-contracted systems analyst Edward Snowden. Snowden gave a cache of documents to two journalists, Glenn Greenwald and Laura Poitras. Greenwald later estimated that the cache contains 15,000–20,000 documents, some very large and detailed, and some very small. In over two subsequent months of publications, it became clear that the NSA had operated a complex web of spying programs that allowed it to intercept Internet and telephone conversations from over a billion users from dozens of countries around the world. Specific revelations were made about China, the European Union, Latin America, Iran and Pakistan, and Australia and New Zealand, however, the published documentation reveals that many of the programs indiscriminately collected bulk information directly from central servers and Internet backbones, which almost invariably carry and reroute information from distant countries.

Due to this central server and backbone monitoring, many of the programs overlapped and interrelated with one another. These programs were often carried out with the assistance of US entities such as the United States Department of Justice and the FBI, were sanctioned by US laws such as the FISA Amendments Act, and the necessary court orders for them were signed by the secret Foreign Intelligence Surveillance Court. Some of the NSA's programs were directly aided by national and foreign intelligence agencies, Britain's GCHQ and Australia's ASD, as well as by large private telecommunications and Internet corporations, such as Verizon, Telstra, Google, and Facebook.

Snowden's disclosures of the NSA's surveillance activities are a continuation of news leaks which have been ongoing since the early 2000s. One year after the September 11, 2001, attacks, former U.S. intelligence official William Binney was publicly critical of the NSA for spying on U.S. citizens.

Further disclosures followed. On 16 December 2005, The New York Times published a report under the headline "Bush Lets U.S. Spy on Callers Without Courts." In 2006, further evidence of the NSA's domestic surveillance of U.S. citizens was provided by USA Today. The newspaper released a report on 11 May 2006, regarding the NSA's "massive database" of phone records collected from "tens of millions" of U.S. citizens. According to USA Today, these phone records were provided by several telecom companies such as AT&T, Verizon, and BellSouth. In 2008, the security analyst Babak Pasdar revealed the existence of the so-called "Quantico circuit" that he and his team discovered in 2003 when brought on to update the carrier's security system. The circuit provided the U.S. federal government with a backdoor into the network of an unnamed wireless provider, which was later independently identified as Verizon.

Snowden's disclosures 

Snowden made his first contact with journalist Glenn Greenwald of The Guardian in late 2012. The timeline of mass surveillance disclosures by Snowden continued throughout the entire year of 2013.

By category 

Documents leaked by Snowden in 2013 include court orders, memos, and policy documents related to a wide range of surveillance activities.

Purposes 

According to the April 2013 summary of documents leaked by Snowden, other than to combat terrorism, these surveillance programs were employed to assess the foreign policy and economic stability of other countries, and to gather "commercial secrets".

In a statement addressed to the National Congress of Brazil in early August 2013, journalist Glenn Greenwald maintained that the U.S. government had used counter-terrorism as a pretext for clandestine surveillance in order to compete with other countries in the "business, industrial and economic fields". In a December 2013 letter to the Brazilian government, Snowden wrote that "These programs were never about terrorism: they're about economic spying, social control, and diplomatic manipulation. They're about power." According to White House panel member NSA didn't stop any terrorist attack. However NSA chief said, that surveillance programs stopped 54 terrorist plots.

In an interview with Der Spiegel published on 12 August 2013, former NSA Director Michael Hayden admitted that "We (the NSA) steal secrets. We're number one in it". Hayden also added: "We steal stuff to make you safe, not to make you rich".

According to documents seen by the news agency Reuters, these "secrets" were subsequently funneled to authorities across the nation to help them launch criminal investigations of Americans. Federal agents are then instructed to "recreate" the investigative trail in order to "cover up" where the information originated.

According to the congressional testimony of Keith B. Alexander, Director of the National Security Agency, one of the purposes of its data collection is to store all the phone records inside a place that can be searched and assessed at all times. When asked by Senator Mark Udall if the goal of the NSA is to collect the phone records of all Americans, Alexander replied, "Yes, I believe it is in the nation's best interest to put all the phone records into a lockbox that we could search when the nation needs to do it."

Targets and methods

Collection of metadata and other content 

In the United States, the NSA is collecting the phone records of more than 300 million Americans. The international surveillance tool XKeyscore allows government analysts to search through vast databases containing emails, online chats and the browsing histories of millions of individuals. Britain's global surveillance program Tempora intercepts the fibre-optic cables that form the backbone of the Internet. Under the NSA's PRISM surveillance program, data that has already reached its final destination would be directly harvested from the servers of the following U.S. service providers: Microsoft, Yahoo!, Google, Facebook, Paltalk, AOL, Skype, YouTube, and Apple Inc.

Contact chaining 

The NSA uses the analysis of phone call and e-mail logs of American citizens to create sophisticated graphs of their social connections that can identify their associates, their locations at certain times, their traveling companions and other personal information.

According to top secret NSA documents leaked by Snowden, during a single day in 2012, the NSA collected e-mail address books from:

 22,881 Gmail accounts
 82,857 Facebook accounts
 105,068 Hotmail accounts
 444,743 Yahoo! accounts

Each day, the NSA collects contacts from an estimated 500,000 buddy lists on live-chat services as well as from the inbox displays of Web-based e-mail accounts. Taken together, the data enables the NSA to draw detailed maps of a person's life based on their personal, professional, religious and political connections.

Data transfer 

Federal agencies in the United States:  Data gathered by these surveillance programs is routinely shared with the U.S. Federal Bureau of Investigation (FBI) and the U.S. Central Intelligence Agency (CIA). In addition, the NSA supplies domestic intercepts to the Drug Enforcement Administration (DEA), Internal Revenue Service (IRS), and other law enforcement agencies.

Foreign countries: As a result of the NSA's secret treaties with foreign countries, data gathered by its surveillance programs are routinely shared with countries who are signatories to the UKUSA Agreement. These foreign countries also help to operate several NSA programs such as XKEYSCORE. (See International cooperation.)

Financial payments monitoring 

A special branch of the NSA called "Follow the Money" (FTM) monitors international payments, banking and credit card transactions and later stores the collected data in the NSA's financial databank, "Tracfin".

Mobile phone location tracking 

Mobile phone tracking refers to the act of attaining the position and coordinates of a mobile phone. According to The Washington Post, the NSA has been tracking the locations of mobile phones from all over the world by tapping into the cables that connect mobile networks globally and that serve U.S. cellphones as well as foreign ones. In the process of doing so, the NSA collects more than 5 billion records of phone locations on a daily basis. This enables NSA analysts to map cellphone owners' relationships by correlating their patterns of movement over time with thousands or millions of other phone users who cross their paths.

In order to decode private conversations, the NSA has cracked the most commonly used cellphone encryption technology, A5/1. According to a classified document leaked by Snowden, the agency can "process encrypted A5/1" even when it has not acquired an encryption key. In addition, the NSA uses various types of cellphone infrastructure, such as the links between carrier networks, to determine the location of a cellphone user tracked by Visitor Location Registers.

Infiltration of smartphones 

As worldwide sales of smartphones grew rapidly, the NSA decided to take advantage of the smartphone boom. This is particularly advantageous because the smartphone contains a variety of data sets that would interest an intelligence agency, such as social contacts, user behaviour, interests, location, photos and credit card numbers and passwords.

According to the documents leaked by Snowden, the NSA has set up task forces assigned to several smartphone manufacturers and operating systems, including Apple Inc.'s iPhone and iOS operating system, as well as Google's Android mobile operating system. Similarly, Britain's GCHQ assigned a team to study and crack the BlackBerry. In addition, there are smaller NSA programs, known as "scripts", that can perform surveillance on 38 different features of the iOS 3 and iOS 4 operating systems. These include the mapping feature, voicemail and photos, as well as Google Earth, Facebook and Yahoo! Messenger.

Infiltration of commercial data centers 

In contrast to the PRISM surveillance program, which is a front-door method of access that is nominally approved by the FISA court, the MUSCULAR surveillance program is noted to be "unusually aggressive" in its usage of unorthodox hacking methods to infiltrate Yahoo! and Google data centres around the world. As the program is operated overseas (United Kingdom), the NSA presumes that anyone using a foreign data link is a foreigner, and is, therefore, able to collect content and metadata on a previously unknown scale from U.S. citizens and residents. According to the documents leaked by Snowden, the MUSCULAR surveillance program is jointly operated by the NSA and Britain's GCHQ agency. (See International cooperation.)

Infiltration of anonymous networks 

The Five Eyes have made repeated attempts to spy on Internet users communicating in secret via the anonymity network Tor. Several of their clandestine operations involve the implantation of malicious code into the computers of anonymous Tor users who visit infected websites. In some cases, the NSA and GCHQ have succeeded in blocking access to the anonymous network, diverting Tor users to insecure channels. In other cases, the NSA and the GCHQ were able to uncover the identity of these anonymous users.

Monitoring of hotel reservation systems 

Under the Royal Concierge surveillance program, Britain's GCHQ agency uses an automated monitoring system to infiltrate the reservation systems of at least 350 luxury hotels in many different parts of the world. Other related surveillance programs involve the wiretapping of room telephones and fax machines used in targeted hotels, as well as the monitoring of computers, hooked up to the hotel network.

Virtual reality surveillance 

The U.S. National Security Agency (NSA), the U.S. Central Intelligence Agency (CIA), and Britain's Government Communications Headquarters (GCHQ) have been conducting surveillance on the networks of many online games, including massively multiplayer online role-playing games (MMORPGs) such as World of Warcraft, as well as virtual worlds such as Second Life, and the Xbox gaming console.

Political Espionage 

According to the April 2013 summary of disclosures, the NSA defined its "intelligence priorities" on a scale of "1" (highest interest) to "5" (lowest interest). It classified about 30 countries as "3rd parties", with whom it cooperates but also spies on:

 Main targets: China, Russia, Iran, Pakistan and Afghanistan were ranked highly on the NSA's list of spying priorities, followed by France, Germany, Japan, and Brazil. The European Union's "international trade" and "economic stability" are also of interest. Other high priority targets include Cuba, Israel, and North Korea.
 Irrelevant: From a US intelligence perspective, countries such as Cambodia, Laos and Nepal were largely irrelevant, as were governments of smaller European Union countries such as Finland, Denmark, Croatia and the Czech Republic.

Other prominent targets included members and adherents of the Internet group known as "Anonymous", as well as potential whistleblowers. According to Snowden, the NSA targeted reporters who wrote critically about the government after 9/11.

As part of a joint operation with the Central Intelligence Agency (CIA), the NSA deployed secret eavesdropping posts in eighty U.S. embassies and consulates worldwide. The headquarters of NATO were also used by NSA experts to spy on the European Union.

In 2013, documents provided by Edward Snowden revealed that the following intergovernmental organizations, diplomatic missions, and government ministries have been subjected to surveillance by the "Five Eyes":

International Cooperation 

During World War II, the BRUSA Agreement was signed by the governments of the United States and the United Kingdom for the purpose of intelligence sharing. This was later formalized in the UKUSA Agreement of 1946 as a secret treaty. The full text of the agreement was released to the public on 25 June 2010.

Although the treaty was later revised to include other countries such as Denmark, Germany, Ireland, Norway, Turkey, and the Philippines, most of the information sharing has been performed by the so-called "Five Eyes", a term referring to the following English-speaking western democracies and their respective intelligence agencies:

  – The Australian Signals Directorate of Australia
  – The Communications Security Establishment of Canada
  – The Government Communications Security Bureau of New Zealand
  – The Government Communications Headquarters of the United Kingdom, which is widely considered to be a leader in traditional spying due to its influence on countries that were once part of the British Empire.
  – The National Security Agency of the United States, which has the biggest budget and the most advanced technical abilities among the "five eyes".

Left: SEA-ME-WE 3, which runs across the Afro-Eurasian supercontinent from Japan to Northern Germany, is one of the most important submarine cables accessed by the "Five Eyes". Singapore, a former British colony in the Asia-Pacific region (blue dot), plays a vital role in intercepting Internet and telecommunications traffic heading from Australia/Japan to Europe, and vice versa. An intelligence-sharing agreement between Singapore and Australia allows the rest of the "Five Eyes" to gain access to SEA-ME-WE 3.

Right: TAT-14, a telecommunications cable linking Europe with the United States, was identified as one of few assets of "Critical Infrastructure and Key Resources" of the US on foreign territory. In 2013, it was revealed that British officials "pressured a handful of telecommunications and Internet companies" to allow the British government to gain access to TAT-14.

According to the leaked documents, aside from the Five Eyes, most other Western countries have also participated in the NSA surveillance system and are sharing information with each other. In the documents the NSA lists "approved SIGINT partners" which are partner countries in addition to the Five Eyes. Glenn Greenwald said that the "NSA often maintains these partnerships by paying its partner to develop certain technologies and engage in surveillance, and can thus direct how the spying is carried out." These partner countries are divided into two groups, "Second Parties" and "Third Parties". The Second Parties are doing comprehensive cooperation with the NSA, and the Third Parties are doing focused cooperation. However, being a partner of the NSA does not automatically exempt a country from being targeted by the NSA itself. According to an internal NSA document leaked by Snowden, "We (the NSA) can, and often do, target the signals of most 3rd party foreign partners."

Australia 

The Australian Signals Directorate (ASD), formerly known as the Defence Signals Directorate (DSD), shares information on Australian citizens with the other members of the UKUSA Agreement. According to a 2008 Five Eyes document leaked by Snowden, data of Australian citizens shared with foreign countries include "bulk, unselected, unminimised metadata" as well as "medical, legal or religious information".

In close cooperation with other members of the Five Eyes community, the ASD runs secret surveillance facilities in many parts of Southeast Asia without the knowledge of Australian diplomats. In addition, the ASD cooperates with the Security and Intelligence Division (SID) of the Republic of Singapore in an international operation to intercept underwater telecommunications cables across the Eastern Hemisphere and the Pacific Ocean.

In March 2017 it was reported that, on advice from the  Five Eyes intelligence alliance, more than 500 Iraqi and Syrian refugees, have been refused entry to Australia, in the last year.

Canada 

The Communications Security Establishment Canada (CSEC) offers the NSA resources for advanced collection, processing, and analysis. It has set up covert sites at the request of NSA. The US-Canada SIGNT relationship dates back to a secret alliance formed during World War II, and was formalized in 1949 under the CANUSA Agreement.

On behalf of the NSA, the CSEC opened secret surveillance facilities in 20 countries around the world.

As well, the Communications Security Establishment Canada has been revealed, following the global surveillance disclosures to be engaging in surveillance on Wifi Hotspots of major Canadian Airports, collecting meta-data to use for engaging in surveillance on travelers, even days after their departure from said airports.

Denmark 

The Politiets Efterretningstjeneste (PET) of Denmark, a domestic intelligence agency, exchanges data with the NSA on a regular basis, as part of a secret agreement with the United States. Being one of the "9-Eyes" of the UKUSA Agreement, Denmark's relationship with the NSA is closer than the NSA's relationship with Germany, Sweden, Spain, Belgium or Italy.

France 

The Directorate-General for External Security (DGSE) of France maintains a close relationship with both the NSA and the GCHQ after discussions for increased cooperation began in November 2006. By the early 2010s, the extent of cooperation in the joint interception of digital data by the DGSE and the NSA was noted to have increased dramatically.

In 2011, a formal memorandum for data exchange was signed by the DGSE and the NSA, which facilitated the transfer of millions of metadata records from the DGSE to the NSA. From December 2012 to 8 January 2013, over 70 million metadata records were handed over to the NSA by French intelligence agencies.

Germany 

The Bundesnachrichtendienst (BND) of Germany systematically transfers metadata from German intelligence sources to the NSA. In December 2012 alone, the BND provided the NSA with 500 million metadata records. The NSA granted the Bundesnachrichtendienst access to X-Keyscore, in exchange for the German surveillance programs Mira4 and Veras.

In early 2013, Hans-Georg Maaßen, President of the German domestic security agency Bundesamt für Verfassungsschutz (BfV), made several visits to the headquarters of the NSA. According to classified documents of the German government, Maaßen agreed to transfer all data records of persons monitored in Germany by the BfV via XKeyscore to the NSA. In addition, the BfV works very closely with eight other U.S. government agencies, including the CIA. Under Project 6, which is jointly operated by the CIA, BfV, and BND, a massive database containing personal information such as photos, license plate numbers, Internet search histories and telephone metadata was developed to gain a better understanding of the social relationships of presumed jihadists.

In 2012, the BfV handed over 864 data sets of personal information to the CIA, NSA and seven other U.S. intelligence agencies. In exchange, the BND received data from U.S. intelligence agencies on 1,830 occasions. The newly acquired data was handed over to the BfV and stored in a domestically accessible system known as NADIS WN.

Israel 

The Israeli SIGINT National Unit (ISNU) routinely receives raw, unfiltered data of U.S. citizens from the NSA. However, a secret NSA document leaked by Snowden revealed that U.S. government officials are explicitly exempted from such forms of data sharing with the ISNU. As stated in a memorandum detailing the rules of data sharing on U.S. citizens, the ISNU is obligated to:

According to the undated memorandum, the ground rules for intelligence sharing between the NSA and the ISNU were laid out in March 2009. Under the data sharing agreement, the ISNU is allowed to retain the identities of U.S. citizens (excluding U.S. government officials) for up to a year.

Japan 

In 2011, the NSA asked the Japanese government to intercept underwater fibre-optic cables carrying phone and Internet data in the Asia-Pacific region. However, the Japanese government refused to comply.

Libya 

Under the reign of Muammar Gaddafi, the Libyan regime forged a partnership with Britain's secret service MI6 and the U.S. Central Intelligence Agency (CIA) to obtain information about Libyan dissidents living in the United States and Canada. In exchange, Gaddafi allowed the Western democracies to use Libya as a base for extraordinary renditions.

Netherlands 

The Algemene Inlichtingen en Veiligheidsdienst (AIVD) of the Netherlands has been receiving and storing data of Internet users gathered by U.S. intelligence sources such as the NSA's PRISM surveillance program. During a meeting in February 2013, the AIVD and the MIVD briefed the NSA on their attempts to hack Internet forums and to collect the data of all users using a technology known as Computer Network Exploitation (CNE).

Norway 

The Norwegian Intelligence Service (NIS) has confirmed that data collected by the agency is "shared with the Americans". Kjell Grandhagen, head of Norwegian military intelligence told reporters at a news conference that "We share this information with partners, and partners share with us ... We are talking about huge amounts of traffic data".

In cooperation with the NSA, the NIS has gained access to Russian targets in the Kola Peninsula and other civilian targets. In general, the NIS provides information to the NSA about "Politicians", "Energy" and "Armament". A top secret memo of the NSA lists the following years as milestones of the Norway-United States of America SIGNT agreement, or NORUS Agreement:

1952 – Informal starting year of cooperation between the NIS and the NSA
 1954 – Formalization of the NORUS Agreement
1963 – Extension of the agreement for coverage of foreign instrumentation signals intelligence (FISINT)
 1970 – Extension of the agreement for coverage of electronic intelligence (ELINT)
 1994 – Extension of the agreement for coverage of communications intelligence (COMINT)

The NSA perceives the NIS as one of its most reliable partners. Both agencies also cooperate to crack the encryption systems of mutual targets. According to the NSA, Norway has made no objections to its requests.

Singapore 

The Defence Ministry of Singapore and its Security and Intelligence Division (SID) have been secretly intercepting much of the fibre optic cable traffic passing through the Asian continent. In close cooperation with the Australian Signals Directorate (ASD/DSD), Singapore's SID has been able to intercept SEA-ME-WE 3 (Southeast Asia-Middle East-Western Europe 3) as well as SEA-ME-WE 4 telecommunications cables. Access to these international telecommunications channels is facilitated by Singapore's government-owned operator, SingTel. Temasek Holdings, a multibillion-dollar sovereign wealth fund with a majority stake in SingTel, has maintained close relations with the country's intelligence agencies.

Information gathered by the Government of Singapore is transferred to the Government of Australia as part of an intelligence sharing agreement. This allows the "Five Eyes" to maintain a "stranglehold on communications across the Eastern Hemisphere".

Spain 

In close cooperation with the Centro Nacional de Inteligencia (CNI), the NSA intercepted 60.5 million phone calls in Spain in a single month.

Sweden 

The Försvarets radioanstalt (FRA) of Sweden (codenamed Sardines) has allowed the "Five Eyes" to access underwater cables in the Baltic Sea. On 5 December 2013, Sveriges Television (Swedish Television) revealed that the FRA has been conducting a clandestine surveillance operation targeting the internal politics of Russia. The operation was conducted on behalf of the NSA, which receives data handed over to it by the FRA.

According to documents leaked by Snowden, the FRA of Sweden has been granted access to the NSA's international surveillance program XKeyscore.

Switzerland 

The Federal Intelligence Service (NDB) of Switzerland exchanges information with the NSA regularly, on the basis of a secret agreement to circumvent domestic surveillance restrictions. In addition, the NSA has been granted access to Swiss surveillance facilities in Leuk (canton of Valais) and Herrenschwanden (canton of Bern), which are part of the Swiss surveillance program Onyx.

According to the NDB, the agency maintains working relationships with about 100 international organizations. However, the NDB has denied any form of cooperation with the NSA. Although the NSA does not have direct access to Switzerland's Onyx surveillance program, the Director of the NDB acknowledged that it is possible for other U.S. intelligence agencies to gain access to Switzerland's surveillance system.

United Kingdom 

The British government allowed the NSA to store personal data of British citizens.

Under Project MINARET, anti-Vietnam War dissidents in the United States were jointly targeted by the GCHQ and the NSA.

United States 

Central Intelligence Agency (CIA)
The CIA pays AT&T more than US$10 million a year to gain access to international phone records, including those of U.S. citizens.

National Security Agency (NSA)
The NSA's Foreign Affairs Directorate interacts with foreign intelligence services and members of the Five Eyes to implement global surveillance.

Federal Bureau of Investigation (FBI)
The FBI acts as the liaison between U.S. intelligence agencies and Silicon Valley giants such as Microsoft.

Department of Homeland Security (DHS)
In the early 2010s, the DHS conducted a joint surveillance operation with the FBI to crack down on dissidents of the Occupy Wall Street protest movement.

Other law enforcement agencies
The NSA supplies domestic intercepts to the Drug Enforcement Administration (DEA), Internal Revenue Service (IRS), and other law enforcement agencies, who use intercepted data to initiate criminal investigations against US citizens. Federal agents are instructed to "recreate" the investigative trail in order to "cover up" where the information originated.

White House

Weeks after the September 11 attacks, U.S. President George W. Bush signed the Patriot Act to ensure no disruption in the government's ability to conduct global surveillance:

The Patriot Act was extended by U.S. President Barack Obama in May 2011 to further extend the federal government's legal authority to conduct additional forms of surveillance such as roving wiretaps.

Commercial cooperation 

Over 70 percent of the United States Intelligence Community's budget is earmarked for payment to private firms. According to Forbes magazine, the defense technology company Lockheed Martin is currently the US's biggest defense contractor, and it is destined to be the NSA's most powerful commercial partner and biggest contractor in terms of dollar revenue.

AT&T 

In a joint operation with the NSA, the American telecommunications corporation AT&T operates Room 641A in the SBC Communications building in San Francisco to spy on Internet traffic. The CIA pays AT&T more than US$10 million a year to gain access to international phone records, including those of U.S. citizens.

Booz Allen Hamilton 

Projects developed by Booz Allen Hamilton include the Strategic Innovation Group to identify terrorists through social media, on behalf of government agencies. During the fiscal year of 2013, Booz Allen Hamilton derived 99% of its income from the government, with the largest portion of its revenue coming from the U.S. Army. In 2013, Booz Allen Hamilton was hailed by Bloomberg Businessweek as "the World's Most Profitable Spy Organization".

British Telecommunications 

British Telecommunications (code-named Remedy), a major supplier of telecommunications, granted Britain's intelligence agency GCHQ "unlimited access" to its network of undersea cables, according to documents leaked by Snowden.

Microsoft 

The American multinational corporation Microsoft helped the NSA to circumvent software encryption safeguards. It also allowed the federal government to monitor web chats on the Outlook.com portal. In 2013, Microsoft worked with the FBI to allow the NSA to gain access to the company's cloud storage service SkyDrive.

Orange S.A. 

The French telecommunications corporation Orange S.A. shares customer call data with the French intelligence agency DGSE, and the intercepted data is handed over to GCHQ.

RSA Security 

RSA Security was paid US$10 million by the NSA to introduce a cryptographic backdoor in its encryption products.

Stratfor 

Strategic Forecasting, Inc., more commonly known as Stratfor, is a global intelligence company offering information to governments and private clients including Dow Chemical Company, Lockheed Martin, Northrop Grumman, Raytheon, the U.S. Department of Homeland Security, the U.S. Defense Intelligence Agency, and the U.S. Marine Corps.

Vodafone 

The British telecommunications company Vodafone (code-named Gerontic) granted Britain's intelligence agency GCHQ "unlimited access" to its network of undersea cables, according to documents leaked by Snowden.

In-Q-Tel 

In-Q-Tel, which receives more than US$56 million a year in government support, is a venture capital firm that enables the CIA to invest in Silicon Valley.

Palantir Technologies 

Palantir Technologies is a data mining corporation with close ties to the FBI, NSA and CIA.

Based in Palo Alto, California, the company developed a data collection and analytical program known as Prism.

In 2011, it was revealed that the company conducted surveillance on Glenn Greenwald.

Surveillance evasion 

Several countries have evaded global surveillance by constructing secret bunker facilities deep below the Earth's surface.

North Korea 

Despite North Korea being a priority target, the NSA's internal documents acknowledged that it did not know much about Kim Jong-un and his regime's intentions.

Iran 

In October 2012, Iran's police chief Esmail Ahmadi Moghaddam alleged that Google is not a search engine but "a spying tool" for Western intelligence agencies. Six months later in April 2013, the country announced plans to introduce an "Islamic Google Earth" to evade global surveillance.

Libya 

Libya evaded surveillance by building "hardened and buried" bunkers at least 40 feet below ground level.

Impact 

The global surveillance disclosure has caused tension in the bilateral relations of the United States with several of its allies and economic partners as well as in its relationship with the European Union. On 12 August 2013, President Obama announced the creation of an "independent" panel of "outside experts" to review the NSA's surveillance programs. The panel is due to be established by the Director of National Intelligence, James R. Clapper, who will consult and provide assistance to them.

According to a survey undertaken by the human rights group PEN International, these disclosures have had a chilling effect on American writers. Fearing the risk of being targeted by government surveillance, 28% of PEN's American members have curbed their usage of social media, and 16% have self-censored themselves by avoiding controversial topics in their writings.

Gallery

See also 

 2013 Department of Justice investigations of reporters
 Terrorist Finance Tracking Program
 Top Secret America

References

Further reading 

 "Global Surveillance" . An annotated and categorized "overview of the revelations following the leaks by the whistleblower Edward Snowden. There are also some links to comments and followups". By Oslo University Library.
 
Politico Staff. "NSA leaks cause flood of political problems." Politico. 13 June 2013.
 NSA inspector general report on email and internet data collection under Stellar Wind as provided by The Guardian on 27 June 2013.
"Putin talks NSA, Syria, Iran, drones in exclusive RT interview (FULL VIDEO)." Russia Today. 12 June 2013.
Ackerman, Spencer. "NSA warned to rein in surveillance as agency reveals even greater scope." The Guardian. 17 July 2013.
Ackerman, Spencer. "Slew of court challenges threaten NSA's relationship with tech firms." The Guardian. Wednesday, 17 July 2013.
Ackerman, Spencer and Paul Lewis. "NSA amendment's narrow defeat spurs privacy advocates for surveillance fight." The Guardian. Thursday, 25 July 2013.
Ackerman, Spencer and Dan Roberts. "US embassy closures used to bolster the case for NSA surveillance programs." The Guardian. Monday 5 August 2013.
Two of the 'trips' (numbers 29 and 76) in the 2006 book, 'No Holiday',  are investigating the NSA and its activities.
Greenwald, Glenn. "Members of Congress denied access to basic information about NSA." The Guardian. Sunday 4 August 2013.
Liu, Edward C. Surveillance of Foreigners Outside the United States Under Section 702 of the Foreign Intelligence Surveillance Act (FISA) Congressional Research Service, 13 April 2016.
MacAskill, Ewen. "Justice Department fails in bid to delay landmark case on NSA collection." The Guardian. Thursday 25 July 2013.
Rushe, Dominic. "Microsoft pushes Eric Holder to lift block on public information sharing." The Guardian. Tuesday 16 July 2013.
Perez, Evan. "Documents shed light on U.S. surveillance programs." (Archive) CNN. 9 August 2013.
 Gellman, Barton. "NSA broke privacy rules thousands of times per year, audit finds." Washington Post. Thursday 15 August 2013.
Roberts, Dan and Robert Booth. "NSA defenders: embassy closures followed pre-9/11 levels of 'chatter'." The Guardian. Sunday 4 August 2013.
Greenwald, Glenn. "The crux of the NSA story in one phrase: 'collect it all'." The Guardian. Monday 15 July 2013.
Sanchez, Julian. "Five things Snowden leaks revealed about NSA’s original warrantless wiretaps." Ars Technica. 9 July 2013.
Forero, Juan. "Paper reveals NSA ops in Latin America." Washington Post. 9 July 2013.
Jabour, Bridie. "Telstra signed deal that would have allowed US spying." The Guardian. Friday 12 July 2013.
Ackerman, Spencer. "White House stays silent on renewal of NSA data collection order." The Guardian. Thursday 18 July 2013.
Naughton, John. "Edward Snowden's not the story. The fate of the internet is." The Guardian. 28 July 2013.
 "Edward Snowden NSA files: secret surveillance and our revelations so far – Leaked National Security Agency documents have led to several hundred Guardian stories on electronic privacy and the state" by The Guardians James Ball on 21 August 2013
 2013-07-29 Letter of FISA Court president Reggie B. Walton to the Chairman of the U.S. Senate Judiciary Committee Patrick J. Leahy about certain operations of the FISA Court; among other things the process of accepting, modifying and/or rejecting surveillance measures proposed by the U.S. government, the interaction between the FISA Court and the U.S. government, the appearance of non-governmental parties before the court and the process used by the Court to consider and resolve any instances where the government entities notifies the court of compliance concerns with any of the FISA authorities.
 A collection of documents relating to surveillance.
 Part 2 of the above.
 Part 3 of the above.
 Documents relating to the surveillance against Dilma Rousseff and Enrique Peña Nieto
 NSA surveillance: A guide to staying secure - The NSA has huge capabilities – and if it wants in to your computer, it's in. With that in mind, here are five ways to stay safe by The Guardians Bruce Schneier on 5 September 2013.

 
GCHQ
National Security Agency
Mass surveillance
Surveillance
Edward Snowden
Espionage
Intelligence operations
National security
Articles containing video clips